The Peerage Act 1963 (c. 48) is an Act of the Parliament of the United Kingdom that permits women peeresses and all Scottish hereditary peers to sit in the House of Lords and allows newly inherited hereditary peerages to be disclaimed.

Background
The Act resulted largely from the protests of Labour politician Tony Benn, then the 2nd Viscount Stansgate. Under British law at the time, peers of England, peers of Great Britain and peers of the United Kingdom (who met certain qualifications, such as age which was (and is) 21) were automatically members of the House of Lords (Scottish and Irish peers who had imperial status which allowed them to sit in the House of Lords but not as Scottish and Irish peers) and could not sit in or vote in elections for the other chamber, the House of Commons.

Thirty peers in the Peerage of Scotland had imperial status when the Act passed.

When William Wedgwood Benn, Tony Benn's father, agreed to accept the Viscountcy, he ascertained that the heir-apparent, his eldest son Michael, did not plan to enter the House of Commons. However, within a few years of the peerage being accepted, Michael Benn was killed in action in the Second World War. Tony Benn, his younger brother, became heir apparent to the peerage and was elected to the House of Commons in 1950. Not wishing to leave it for the other House, he campaigned through the 1950s for a change in the law. In 1960, the 1st Viscount died and Tony Benn inherited the title, automatically losing his seat in the House of Commons as a member for the constituency of Bristol South East. In the ensuing by-election, however, Benn was re-elected to the Commons, despite being disqualified. An election court ruled that he could not take his seat, instead awarding it to the runner-up, the Conservative Malcolm St Clair.

In 1963, the Conservative Government agreed to introduce a Peerage Bill, allowing individuals to disclaim peerages; it received Royal Assent on 31 July 1963. Tony Benn was the first peer to make use of the Act. St Clair, fulfilling a promise he had made at the time of taking his seat, accepted the office of Steward of the Manor of Northstead the previous day, thereby disqualifying himself from the House (outright resignation is prohibited), and Benn was then re-elected in Bristol South East at the ensuing by-election.

Disclaiming peerages
To disclaim a hereditary peerage, the peer must deliver an instrument of disclaimer to the lord chancellor within one year of succeeding to the peerage, or within one year after the passage of the Act, or, if under the age of 21 at the time of succession, before the peer's 22nd birthday.  If, at the time of succession, the peer is a member of the House of Commons, then the instrument must be delivered within one month of succession, and until such an instrument is delivered, the peer may neither sit nor vote in the lower House. Prior to the House of Lords Act 1999, a hereditary peer could not disclaim a peerage after having applied for a writ of summons to Parliament; now, however, hereditary peers do not have the automatic right to a writ of summons to the House. A peer who disclaims the peerage loses all titles, rights and privileges associated with the peerage; if they are married, so does their spouse. No further hereditary peerage may be conferred upon the person, but a life peerage may be. The peerage remains without a holder until the death of the peer who had made the disclaimer, when it descends to his or her heir in the usual manner.

The one-year window after the passage of the Act soon proved to be of importance at the highest levels of British politics, after the resignation of Harold Macmillan as Prime Minister in October 1963. Two hereditary peers wished to be considered to replace him, but by this time it was considered requisite that a prime minister sit in the Commons. The 2nd Viscount Hailsham and the 14th Earl of Home took advantage of the Act to disclaim their peerages, despite having inherited them in 1950 and 1951 respectively. Sir Alec Douglas-Home, as Lord Home now became, was chosen as prime minister; both men later returned to the House of Lords as life peers.

Since the abolition in 1999 of the general right of hereditary peers to sit in the House of Lords, and the consequent removal of the general disability of such peers to sit in or vote for the House of Commons, it is no longer necessary for hereditary peers to disclaim their peerages for this purpose. In 2001, The 3rd Viscount Thurso became the first British hereditary peer to be elected to the Commons and take his seat. Later that year, Douglas Hogg inherited the peerage his father (Quintin Hogg) had disclaimed, but did not have to disclaim it himself to continue sitting in the House of Commons. In 2004, Michael Ancram became Marquess of Lothian on the death of his father, and was also able to continue sitting as an MP. On their retirements from the House of Commons, Lord Lothian (formerly Lord Ancram) and Hogg entered the House of Lords as life peers, while Lord Thurso was elected as an excepted hereditary peer after losing reelection as an MP. Since the chief purpose for the Act ended in 1999, only one disclaimer has occurred — Christopher Silkin disclaimed the title 3rd Baron Silkin in 2002.

The Act only applies to titles held in the Peerage of England, the Peerage of Scotland, the Peerage of Great Britain, and the Peerage of the United Kingdom. No provision was made by the Act for titles in the Peerage of Ireland to be disclaimed, as the entitlement of new Irish representative peers to be elected to sit in the House of Lords was considered to have lapsed after most of Ireland became independent as the Irish Free State in December 1922 (and the last surviving Irish representative peer had died in 1961).

List of disclaimed peerages

Notes

Other provisions
The Act granted peers of Scotland the same right to sit in the House of Lords as peers of England, Great Britain or the United Kingdom, thereby ending the election of representative peers, thereby increasing the number of peers of Scotland in the Lords (who did not already sit as holder of another British peerage) from 16 to about 46.
An amendment that would have allowed Irish peers to sit in the House as well was defeated by ninety votes to eight.

The Act removed the disqualification of peers of Ireland, by virtue of an Irish peerage, to vote in elections for members of the House of Commons; and to sit in the British House of Commons without losing the privilege of peerage.

The Act also granted suo jure hereditary women peers (other than those in the Peerage of Ireland) the right to sit in the House of Lords, which introduced twelve new women to the House. This was not the first time that women were members of the House of Lords; the Life Peerages Act 1958 allowed all life peers (men and women) to sit in the House. The 2nd Baroness Ravensdale had already entered the Lords in 1958 through the receipt of a life peerage. The women who took their seats in the House after the Peerage Act 1963 and before the House of Lords Act 1999 were:

Scottish hereditary peers

Scottish peers with imperial status

Notes

Scottish representative peers became automatic members

Eligible to sit

The holder of the Earldom of Newburgh wasn't eligible as she was an Italian citizen.

Irish hereditary peers

Irish peers with imperial status

Ian Eden, 9th Baron Auckland and Peter Carington, 6th Baron Carrington are not counted on the list as they were both the 9th and 6th Barons of their respective Peerages in both the Peerage of Great Britain and Peerage of Ireland and their place in the order of precedence was Barons of the Peerage of Great Britain. 
Notes

Irish peers with full voting rights

Notes

Female hereditary peers

Who took their seat

Who did not take their seat

See also
Peerage Act 1963 (Wikisource)
 List of peerages inherited by women
 House of Lords Reform Act 2014

References

External links
 Cox, Noel. "The Legal Standing of the Peerage and Baronetage." New Zealand Universities Law Review.
 Peerage Act 1963.
Women Hereditary Peers
Image of the Act on the Parliamentary website

United Kingdom Acts of Parliament 1963
Constitutional laws of the United Kingdom
Tony Benn
Acts of the Parliament of the United Kingdom concerning the House of Lords
Alec Douglas-Home